was a Japanese politician who served as Minister of Internal Affairs and Communications under Prime Ministers Shinzō Abe and Yasuo Fukuda until 12 June 2009.

Biography 

Kunio Hatoyama was born in Tokyo in 1948. He was a son of Yasuko Hatoyama and Iichirō Hatoyama, a bureaucrat who later became a third-generation politician, and grandson of Ichirō Hatoyama, who became the President of the Liberal Democratic Party (LDP) and Prime Minister of Japan between 1954 and 1956. His brother Yukio Hatoyama, also a politician and leader of the rival Democratic Party of Japan, became the country's Prime Minister in September 2009 following a landslide victory in the August 2009 election. His maternal grandfather was Shōjirō Ishibashi, founder of Bridgestone.

Hatoyama attended the Faculty of Law at the University of Tokyo and graduated with a degree in political science. He wanted to get into politics right away and became an aide to Prime Minister Kakuei Tanaka. He ran for the House of Representatives in 1976 as a member of the New Liberal Club and entered the LDP after winning.

In 1993, he left the LDP and became a conservative independent, saying he wanted to form a new party to oppose the LDP.  He was briefly Minister of Education, Science, Sports and Culture in the Cabinet of Prime Minister Tsutomu Hata.

In 1994, he helped form the now-defunct New Frontier Party, which he left in 1996 to form the Democratic Party of Japan with his brother, Yukio Hatoyama, and became the Vice Leader of the opposition. Divisions between the brothers eventually led him to leave the DPJ in 1999, and he re-joined the LDP in 2000 after running unsuccessfully for the seat of the Governor of Tokyo.

He joined the Shinzō Abe cabinet as Justice Minister in August 2007, and maintained his post through the September inauguration of the cabinet of Yasuo Fukuda. Serial killer Tsutomu Miyazaki was executed during his tenure. After the execution, he was called "Grim Reaper" by the Asahi Shimbun, which made him angry.

Subsequently, in the Cabinet of Prime Minister Tarō Asō, appointed on 24 September 2008, Hatoyama was moved to the post of Minister of Internal Affairs and Communications. In a dispute with Asō over a possible replacement of Japan Post Holdings president Yoshifumi Nishikawa Hatoyama resigned on 12 June 2009.

Personal life
He was married to Emily Hatoyama (née Emily Baird, aka Emily Takami), the daughter of an Australian army sergeant, Jimmy Baird, and a Japanese woman. Emily is a former model and actress. The couple has three children, Tarō Hatoyama, Hanako Hatoyama and Jirō Hatoyama.

Hatoyama died on 21 June 2016 in a hospital in Tokyo, at the age of 67. He was survived by his wife, three children and five grandchildren.

Controversies

Views on the death penalty 
In September 2007, Hatoyama caused a controversy after making a remark during a press conference, where he suggested a system in which execution of death row inmates could take place without him having to sign the final execution order, as currently required by Japanese law. He came under criticism from opponents to capital punishment such as Amnesty International Japan for his attitude, which said that he was trying to avoid accountability as well as showing disregard for human rights.

Remarks about the Bali bombing 
In October 2007, during a news conference, Hatoyama attempted to justify plans to fingerprint and photograph all foreigners at immigration by claiming that an unidentified "friend of a friend", who is an Al-Qaeda terrorist involved in the 2002 Bali bombings, was able to sneak in and out of Japan repeatedly over the following years using different passports and wearing a fake moustache. He added that he had received prior warning to stay away from the centre of Bali because it would be bombed. The remarks were made during a news conference at Foreign Correspondents' Club of Japan in Tokyo, where he was trying to explain the necessity of new anti-terrorism measures being implemented whereby all foreigners entering the country will be fingerprinted and photographed.

Later that day, he gave another press conference in which he retracted his remarks, saying instead that it was actually his friend who had received a prior warning about the bombing, and that he only found out about the warning three or four months after the bombing. He also issued a statement denying any connections to members of Al-Qaeda, as well as apologising to Prime Minister Fukuda for the confusion he caused.

Revisionism
Hatoyama was affiliated to the openly revisionist organization Nippon Kaigi.

Ancestry

Notes

References
 Itoh, Mayumi (2003). The Hatoyama Dynasty: Japanese Political Leadership through the Generations. New York: Palgrave Macmillan. , . .

Further reading

External links 

  

|-

|-

|-

|-

|-

|-

|-

|-

|-

|-

1948 births
2016 deaths
Bridgestone people
Democratic Party of Japan politicians
Education ministers of Japan
Ministers of Labour of Japan
Kunio
Liberal Democratic Party (Japan) politicians
Members of the House of Representatives (Japan)
Ministers of Internal Affairs of Japan
Ministers of Justice of Japan
New Frontier Party (Japan) politicians
20th-century Japanese politicians
Politicians from Tokyo
Tokyo gubernatorial candidates
Members of Nippon Kaigi
University of Tokyo alumni
21st-century Japanese politicians
Presidents of the Japan Futsal Federation